The Hugo Award for Best Graphic Story is given each year for science fiction or fantasy stories told in graphic form and published or translated into English during the previous calendar year. It has been awarded annually since 2009. The Hugo Awards have been described as "a fine showcase for speculative fiction" and "the best known literary award for science fiction writing".

In the 17 nomination years, 94 works from 58 series have been nominated, including Retro Hugos. Works from 12 different series have won the award, including Retro Hugos. Girl Genius, written by Kaja and Phil Foglio, drawn by Phil Foglio, and colored by Cheyenne Wright, won the first three awards. After their third straight win in 2011, the Girl Genius team announced that, in order to show the category was a "viable award", they were refusing nomination for the following year (after which the award was up for re-ratification); Girl Genius was nominated a fourth time in 2014. For the following five years, the award was taken by a different series or work every year, and included both webcomics and installments of published series. The 2017–2019 awards saw the second series to win three times, Marjorie Liu and Sana Takeda's Monstress, and has been followed since by different works each year. The three Retro Hugos were won by early comic books such as Bill Finger and Bob Kane's Batman #1, William Moulton Marston and H. G. Peter's Wonder Woman #5: "Battle for Womanhood", and Jerry Siegel and Joe Shuster's Superman: "The Mysterious Mr. Mxyzptlk". Monstress and Brian K. Vaughan and Fiona Staples's Saga have the most nominations at six, followed by Howard Tayler's Schlock Mercenary at five, while Bill Willingham's Fables, Brian K. Vaughan and Cliff Chiang's Paper Girls, and Alex Raymond's Flash Gordon have been nominated four times. Nine other works have at least two nominations.

Selection

Hugo Award nominees and winners are chosen by supporting or attending members of the annual World Science Fiction Convention, or Worldcon, and the presentation evening constitutes its central event. The selection process is defined in the World Science Fiction Society Constitution as instant-runoff voting with six nominees, except in the case of a tie as happened in 2009. The graphic stories on the ballot are the six most-nominated by members that year, with no limit on the number of stories that can be nominated. Initial nominations are made by members in January through March, while voting on the ballot of six nominations is performed roughly in April through July, subject to change depending on when that year's Worldcon is held. Prior to 2017, the final ballot was five works; it was changed that year to six, with each initial nominator limited to five nominations. Worldcons are generally held near the start of September, and are held in a different city around the world each year. In addition to the regular Hugo awards, beginning in 1996 Retrospective Hugo Awards, or "Retro Hugos", have been available to be awarded for 50, 75, or 100 years prior. Retro Hugos may be awarded only for years in which a World Science Fiction Convention, or Worldcon, was hosted but no awards were originally given. To date, Retro Hugo awards have been given for graphic stories only for 1941 and 1944.

Winners and nominees

In the following table, the years correspond to the date of the ceremony, rather than when the story was first published. Entries with a blue background have won the award; those with a white background are the other nominated works.

  *   Winners and joint winners

Retro Hugos

Beginning with the 1996 Worldcon, the World Science Fiction Society created the concept of "Retro Hugos", in which the Hugo award could be retroactively awarded for 50, 75, or 100 years prior. Retro Hugos may be awarded only for years after 1939 in which no awards were originally given. The only times the Graphic Story category has both existed and received enough nominations to support a Retro Hugo category was in 2016 for 1941, 2019 for 1944, and 2020 for 1945.

References

External links

 

Comics awards
Graphic Story